Nurmi is a Finnish surname. Notable people with the surname include:

 Anne Nurmi (born 1968), Finnish singer, composer and keyboard player, a member of the band Lacrimosa
 Dovima Nurmi, Spanish drag queen
 Juha Nurmi (born 1959), Finnish retired ice hockey player
 Luka Nurmi (born 2004), Finnish racing driver
 Maila Nurmi (1922–2008), Finnish-American actress who created the 1950s character Vampira
 Markus Nurmi (born 1998), Finnish ice hockey player
 Mauno Nurmi (1936–2018), retired football and ice hockey player
 Noah Nurmi (born 2001), Finnish footballer
 Osku Nurmi, Finnish radio personality
 Paavo Nurmi (1897–1973), Finnish runner, nine-time Olympic champion
 Teemu Nurmi (born 1985), Finnish ice hockey player

Finnish-language surnames

fr:Nurmi
mk:Nurmi